Bantry House is a historic house with gardens in Bantry, County Cork, Ireland. Originally built in the early 18th century, it has been owned and occupied by the White family (formerly Earls of Bantry) since the mid-18th century. Opened to the public since the 1940s, the house, estate and gardens are a tourist destination in West Cork.

History
Bantry House (originally called 'Blackrock') was constructed in about 1710 on the South side of Bantry Bay. In 1750, Councillor Richard White bought Blackrock from Samuel Hutchinson and changed the name to 'Seafield'.

The Whites had settled on Whiddy Island across the Bay in the late 17th century, after having originally been merchants in Limerick. The family prospered and considerable purchases of land were made in the area surrounding the house. The house has been open to tourism since 1946.

Gardens

The gardens to Bantry House were developed by Richard White, 2nd Earl of Bantry and his wife Mary. The gardens contain seven terraces; the house is located on the third. One hundred steps are located behind the house and fountain, and are surrounded by azaleas and rhododendron.

By 1997 the grounds of Bantry House were suffering from neglect in certain places. A European grant was obtained to start the restoration process. Funding ceased in 2000. The restoration work is still ongoing.

Armada centre

An exhibition on the role Bantry House played in the United Irishmen Rebellion was opened in the courtyard of the house ahead of the rebellion's bi-centenary. The exhibition was designed to cover the French expedition to Ireland in 1796, and the role of Richard White, then owner of the house and later 1st Earl of Bantry, in opposing the attempted landings. Ultimately the French armada never landed, as severe weather resulted in the loss of several ships – including the frigate Surveillante. The Armada Centre contained a scale model of the Surveillante and several artifacts recovered from its wreck.

See also
 Earl of Bantry
 Historic Cork Gardens
 West Cork Chamber Music Festival

References

External links
 Bantry House Website

Bantry
Buildings and structures in County Cork
Houses in the Republic of Ireland
Bed and breakfasts
Museums in County Cork
Historic house museums in the Republic of Ireland
Gardens in County Cork